Diplotaxodon macrops is a species of haplochromine cichlid which is endemic to Lake Malawi. It is found throughout the lake in Malawi, Mozambique, and Tanzania. Within Lake Malawi it is abundant near the lake bed over rock shelves. It appears to be a plankton eating species that feeds on insect larvae, crustaceans, and diatoms.

References

macrops
Taxa named by George F. Turner
Taxa named by Jay Richard Stauffer Jr.
Fish described in 1998
Cichlid fish of Africa
Taxonomy articles created by Polbot